Hermat Gangapersad (born 19 June 1969) is a former Trinidadian cricketer who represented the Trinidad and Tobago national team in West Indian domestic cricket. He played as a wicket-keeper.

Gangapersad represented the West Indies under-19s at the 1988 Youth World Cup in Australia. He scored only 97 runs from eight innings, but recorded 15 dismissals while keeping wicket, second only to Australia's Darren Berry overall. Gangapersad had made his first-class debut for Trinidad and Tobago almost a year before the World Cup, playing a Shell Shield match against Guyana at the age of 17. He made semi-regular appearances at that level over the following seasons, but then migrated to the United States when he played cricket throughout the NY Tri- state areas  His highest first-class score (and only half-century) was an innings of 50 runs made against the Windward Islands in January 1993.

References

External links
Player profile and statistics at Cricket Archive
Player profile and statistics at ESPNcricinfo

1969 births
Living people
People from Tunapuna–Piarco
Trinidad and Tobago cricketers